Karnatakada Haridasaru is a historical thesis written by Dr. H. K. Vedavyasachar on the origin, growth, and development of the Haridasa Order of Karnataka.

The work explores Dasa Sahitya and its origins in relation to the history of religion, philosophy and mysticism. The book is divided into two major parts: History of Religions and a Detailed analysis of Haridasas of Karnataka.

Synopsis

History of Religions 
The first part is devoted to the study of the history of religion. The author inquires into its meaning, reason for its existence, its values and sanctions, and the different aspects of the manifestations of the religious spirit among the religions of the world and their variations.

The major topics covered in the first part are:

 ಧರ್ಮದ ಅವಶ್ಯಕತೆ (Necessity of Religion)
 ಧರ್ಮಗಳ ಇತಿವೃತ್ತ (History of Religion)
 ವೈದಿಕ ಧರ್ಮದ ಮುಖ್ಯ ಪ್ರಮೇಯಗಳು (Prime Subject of Vedic religion )
 ಭಕ್ತಿಯ ಪ್ರಮುಖ ವಿವೇಚನೆ (Insight into Devotion)
 ಯೋಗ (Mysticism)
 ಭಾರತದಲ್ಲಿ ಭಕ್ತಿ (Devotional movement in India)

Detailed analysis of Haridasas of Karnataka 

The second part offers analysis of the Haridasas of Karnataka led by Sri Madhwacharyaru. Covered individuals include Narahariteertharu, Sripadarajaru, Vyasarayaru, Vadirajaru, Purandaradasaru, Kanakadasaru, Vijayeendrateertharu, Kumara Vyasaru, Vaikunthadasaru, Sri Raghavendra Swamigalu, Prasanna Venkatesharu, Vijayadasaru, Giriyamma, Varadendrateertharu, Vyasatatvagna Yatigalu, Mohanadasaru, Gopaladasaru, Jagannathadasaru, Bhagannadasaru and Praneshadasaru in the development of the Bhakti-Siddhantha through Haridasa Sahitya.

The major topics covered in the second part are as below:

Kannada Haridasaru
 ಹರಿದಾಸರ ಪರಿಚಯ (Introduction to Haridasas)
 ಆರಂಭಕಾಲ (Birth of Haridasa Movement)
 ಉನ್ನತಿಕಾಲ (The Rise of Haridasa Movement)
 ವಿಸ್ತಾರಕಾಲ (The Spread of Haridasa Movement)
 ಅವನತಿಕಾಲ (The decline of Haridasa Movement)
 ಹರಿಯ ವಿಶೇಷ ಮಹಿಮೆಗಳು (Lord Vishnu's Divine Powers)
 ಭಗವಂತನ ಸೃಷ್ಟಿ ವೈಚಿತ್ರ್ಯ (Wonders in God's Creation)
 ತಾರತಮ್ಯ (Hierarchy)
 ಹರಿದಾಸರ ಪ್ರಶಂಸೆ (A tribute to Haridasas)
 ಹರಿದಾಸರ ಗ್ರಂಥಗಳು (Great literatures of Haridasas)
 ಹರಿದಾಸರು ಮತ್ತು ಕರ್ನಾಟಕ ಸಂಗೀತವು (the relationship between Haridasa literature and Carnatic music)

Publication 

Before being published as a book in 1965, the author submitted this in 1954 as a PhD thesis ("Karnatakada Haridasaru")  for the University of Bombay. 

After this, Parimala Research and Publishing House, Najangud brought out the contents of the thesis as a serial in the magazine Parimala (posthumously for the author). The same publishing house went on to release the first edition in 1965 and a second edition in 1992. 

The third edition in 2005 was brought out by Sri Raghavendraswamy Mutt, Mantralayam.

See also 

 Dasa sahitya
 Dvaita
 Raghavendra Swami

References

External links 
 Sri Raghavendraswamy Mutt, Mantralayam

Dvaita Vedanta
Haridasa